Cameron Oliver (born July 11, 1996) is an American professional basketball player who last played for the South Bay Lakers of the NBA G League. He played college basketball for the Nevada Wolf Pack.

High school career
Oliver missed his junior year at Grant Union High School due to an ACL injury, before averaging 21.5 points and ten rebounds as a senior.

College career
Coming out of high school, he committed to Oregon State, but de-committed after a coaching change and eventually sat out the 2014-15 season. He joined the Nevada Wolf Pack for the 2015-16 season, where he enjoyed an outstanding freshman year, averaging 13.4 points, 9.1 rebounds and 2.6 blocked shots a game. Oliver was a key part of a Wolf Pack squad that won the College Basketball Invitational that year. He made the All-Mountain West Third Team as well as the All-Defensive Team and was named Freshman of the Year by the MW media.

In 2016–17, Oliver saw the floor in 35 games to average 16.0 points, 8.7 rebounds, 2.6 blocks and 1.8 assists per outing, guiding Nevada to a 28-7 record and the MW Tournament Championship title. For his efforts, Oliver earned All-MWC First Team and Defensive Player of the Year distinction. His 190 blocks in 73 games ranked him third on Nevada’s all-time list, when he left after the conclusion of the 2016-17 season. Oliver received the gift of his first child in December 2016 by his Wife Alecia Ashford who been with Oliver every step of he way .

Oliver declared for the 2017 NBA draft and was invited to the NBA scouting combine in Chicago.

Professional career

Wisconsin Herd (2017–2018)
After going undrafted in 2017 NBA draft, Oliver spent the NBA Summer League and preseason with the Houston Rockets, but a hand injury in early October led to his release. In November 2017, he joined the Wisconsin Herd of the NBA G League.

Delaware 87ers / Blue Coats (2018–2019)
On January 26, 2018, Oliver was traded, alongside Shannon Brown, to the Delaware 87ers in exchange for James Blackmon Jr. and the returning player rights to Russ Smith.

In July 2018, Oliver played for the Philadelphia 76ers during the NBA Summer League. After a training camp stint with the Portland Trail Blazers, Oliver re-joined the Delaware Blue Coats for the 2018–19 season. On January 30, 2019, he was ruled out for the rest of the season with a fractured right ankle.

Cairns Taipans (2019–2020)
On July 26, 2019, Oliver signed with the Cairns Taipans in Australia for the 2019–20 NBL season. He was named to the All-NBL Second Team. Oliver averaged 17 points, 9.1 rebounds and 1.6 blocks per game while shooting 54 percent from the field.

Ironi Nes Ziona (2020)
On May 14, 2020, Oliver signed with Ironi Nes Ziona of the Israeli Basketball Premier League.

Return to Cairns (2020–2021)
On November 16, 2020, Oliver re-signed with the Cairns Taipans on a two-year deal. On April 18, 2021, he left the Taipans to return home for personal reasons. He was later released from the final year of his contract with Cairns.

Houston Rockets (2021)
On May 10, 2021, Oliver signed a 10-day contract with the Houston Rockets. He averaged 10.8 points and 5.3 rebounds in four games to finish the 2020–21 NBA season.

South Bay Lakers (2021)
In August 2021, Oliver joined the Golden State Warriors for the 2021 NBA Summer League and on September 29, he signed an Exhibit 10 contract with the Los Angeles Lakers. He was waived on October 15, and on October 23, he was acquired by the South Bay Lakers of the NBA G League as an affiliate player.

Atlanta Hawks (2021–2022)
On December 29, 2021, Oliver signed a 10-day contract with the Atlanta Hawks.

Return to South Bay (2022)
After his 10-day contract with the Hawks expired, Oliver returned to the South Bay Lakers.

Unicaja (2022)
On February 25, 2022, Oliver signed with Unicaja Malaga of the Liga ACB.

TNT Tropang Giga (2022)
In August 2022, he signed with the TNT Tropang Giga of the Philippine Basketball Association (PBA) as the team's import for the 2022–23 PBA Commissioner's Cup.

Third stint with South Bay (2022–2023)
On December 19, 2022, Oliver was reacquired by the South Bay Lakers. On March 5, 2023, Oliver was waived.

Career statistics

NBA

Regular season

|-
| style="text-align:left;"| 
| style="text-align:left;"| Houston
| 4 || 0 || 21.8 || .576 || .308 || .250 || 5.3 || 1.3 || .5 || 1.0 || 10.8
|-
| style="text-align:left;"| 
| style="text-align:left;"| Atlanta
| 2 || 0 || 21.5 || .667 || .333 || .667 || 3.0 || 1.5 || .5 || .5 || 11.5
|- class="sortbottom"
| style="text-align:center;" colspan="2"| Career
| 6 || 0 || 21.7 || .604 || .313 || .429 || 4.5 || 1.3 || .5 || .8 || 11.0

References

External links

 NBA player profile
 Nevada Wolf Pack bio

1996 births
Living people
American expatriate basketball people in Australia
American expatriate basketball people in the Philippines
American expatriate basketball people in Spain
American men's basketball players
Atlanta Hawks players
Basketball players from Oakland, California
Cairns Taipans players
Delaware 87ers players
Delaware Blue Coats players
Houston Rockets players
Leones de Ponce basketball players
Liga ACB players
Nevada Wolf Pack men's basketball players
Philippine Basketball Association imports
Small forwards
South Bay Lakers players
TNT Tropang Giga players
Undrafted National Basketball Association players
Wisconsin Herd players